Jim Warren (born November 24, 1949, in Long Beach, California) is an American artist best known for book cover illustrations and surrealistic fantasy art. He has worked in surrealistic fantasy since about 1969. He has collaborated on paintings with marine life artist Wyland, and artist Michael Godard. Warren currently lives in Clearwater, Florida. 

A self-taught artist, Warren uses traditional oil paint and brushes on stretched canvas.

Early life and career
Warren was born in Long Beach to Don and Betty Warren, and began painting as a child. His choice of an artistic career path was made in high school.

Books 
 The Art of Jim Warren: An American Original (Art Lover Products, 1997). .
 Painted Worlds (Paper Tiger Books, 2002)
 The Art of Jim Warren, 2015

References

External links

Artists from Portland, Oregon
1949 births
Living people
People from Long Beach, California
Album-cover and concert-poster artists